"Central Park Arrest" is a song composed by Lynsey de Paul for the vocal trio Thunderthighs, and told the story of a policewoman apprehending a flasher in New York's Central Park. This song in the style of TV cop theme tunes of the day featured police sirens wailing, shots being fired and megaphone radio. The song was a top 30 hit in the UK Singles Chart. The release garnered good reviews in the music press, with Record World choosing it as a single pick and saying "Do-do-do ladies from Lou Reed's "Walk on the Wild Side" do their own hit shopping'". It was released as a track on the compilation album, Dancing On A Saturday Night, Vol. 2, on the Philips record label. The recording was released in 1994 on World Hits 1974, a German compilation CD album as well as on the CD, Tower Of Strength. In 2009, it was included on the 5 CD box set 100 Hits Collection 70's.

The song's writer recorded her own version on the B-side to the hit single "No, Honestly" a few months later, as a lighter bongo driven song. More recently, de Paul's version appeared on her anthology album, Into my Music. It is still played on the radio in the US and the UK.

References

Thunderthighs songs
Songs written by Lynsey de Paul
1974 songs
Jet Records singles
Philips Records singles
Central Park